George Ives may refer to:

 George Burnham Ives (1856–1930), American bibliographer, editor, and translator
 George Cecil Ives (1867–1950), German-British poet, writer, penal reformer and early gay rights campaigner
 George Edward Ives (1845–1894), American musician and father of Charles Ives
 George Frederick Ives (1881–1993), Canadian, last surviving veteran of the Second Boer War
 George Homer Ives (1836–1863), American bandit and villain
 George Ives (actor) (1926–2013), American actor

See also
 Ives, a surname